Naddi is a village in the Indian state of Himachal Pradesh. It is located at an altitude of 2000 meters above sea level, in the upper reaches of the Kangra valley. The village is situated about 3 kilometers from Mc Leod Ganj, known worldwide for the presence of the Dalai Lama. On 29 April 1959, the 14th Dalai Lama (Tenzin Gyatso) established the Tibetan exile administration in the north Indian hill station of Mussoorie. In May 1960, the Central Tibetan Administration (CTA) was moved to Dharamshala.

Culture 
Most of the inhabitants are from the Gaddi tribe, and they speak the Gaddi language.

Geography 
Naddi has an average elevation of 2000 meter. Naddi is located in the Kangra valley, in the shadow of the Dhauladhar mountains. The village is accessible by road from Dharamshala and McLeod Ganj. Naddi is surrounded by pine, Himalayan oak (Quercus semecarpifolia), and rhododendron.

Climate 
Naddi has a monsoon-influenced humid subtropical climate (Cwa). Summer starts in early April, peaks in early June (when temperatures can reach 36 °C) and last till mid-June. From July to mid-September is the monsoon season when up to 3000 mm (120 inches) of rainfall can be experienced. Autumn is mild and lasts from October to the end of November.

Autumn temperatures average around 16–17 °C. Winter starts in December and continues until late February. Snow and sleet are common during the winter in Naddi. Winter is followed by a short, pleasant spring until April. Historically, the Dhauladhar mountains used to remain snow-covered all year long, however, in recent years they have been losing their snow blanket during dry spells.

The best times to visit are the autumn and spring months.

Trekkings 
Naddi is a starting point for a number of trekkings. A 3-km amble takes one to McLeod Ganj, another 3-km walk leads to the village of Dharamkot. If one wishes to go on a longer walk then he/she can trek 8-km to Triund. The snow line of Ilaqa Got is just a 5-km walk from Triund. Kareri Lake is another famous trekking destination.

References

Villages in Shimla district